The Superior Court of California, County of Marin, is the branch of the California superior court with jurisdiction over Marin County. It is housed in the landmark Marin County Civic Center, designed by architect Frank Lloyd Wright and completed in 1962.

History
Marin County was one of the original counties formed in 1850 when California gained statehood.

Marin County initially conducted its court activities in two temporary buildings in the county seat of San Rafael: first in a restored Mission building (1851–56) and then in a converted home that once belonged to Timothy Murphy (1856–73). A permanent courthouse was built at Fourth and A starting in 1872. That courthouse served the county until the new Civic Center was completed in the late 1960s; after it was abandoned, the 1872 courthouse was burned in what authorities suspected was an arson on May 25, 1971.

References

External links
 

Superior Court
Superior courts in California